This article describes about the squads for the 2022 UEFA Women's Under-19 Championship.

Group A

Czech Republic 
Head coach: Jan Navrátil

Italy 
Head coach: Enrico Maria Sbardella

Spain 
Head coach: Pedro López

France 
Head coach: Sandrine Ringler

Group B

Sweden 
Head coach: Caroline Sjöblom

Norway 
Head coach: Hege Riise

England 
Head coach: Gemma Davies

Germany 
Head coach: Kathrin Peter

References

UEFA Women's Under-19 Championship squads